The Weilwan (also known as Wayilwan, Wailwan, Ngiyampaa Wailwan and Ngemba Wailwan) are an Aboriginal Australian people of the state of New South Wales. They are a clan of the Ngiyampaa nation.

Name
The Weilwan ethnonym is derived from their word for "no" in the Ngiyambaa language, (weil/wail/wayil).

Like other Ngiyampaa people such as the Wangaaypuwan, they also referred to themselves according to their home country.

Language

The Weilwan spoke the dialect of Ngiyambaa called "Ngiyampaa Wayilwan" and as such also called themselves "those who speak Ngiyampaa the Wayilwan way".

Country
Weilwan country covered , running along the southern bank of the Barwon River from Brewarrina to Walgett, and along Marra Creek and the Castlereagh, Marthaguy, and Macquarie rivers. Their southern frontier was at Quambone and in the vicinity of Coonamble.

Social organisation
The Weilwan were divided into kin groups, one of which is known: the Waiabara.

Alternative names

 Ngemba (name of their language)
 Ngemba (name of their language)
 Ngiumba (name of their language)
 Ngiyampaa (name of their language)
 Ngiyampaa Wayilwan (those who speak Ngiyampaa the Wayilwan way)
 Waal-won
 Wahoon (misprint) )
 Wailwan
 Wailwun
 Wali
 Waljwan
 Wallwan
 Wayilwan
 Weilwun
 Wilawun
 Wile Wan
 Wilwan

Notes

Citations

Sources

Aboriginal peoples of New South Wales